Marta Aura (4 September 1942 – 8 July 2022) was a Mexican actress.

Life and career
Aura was born in Mexico City on 4 September 1942, the daughter of Olimpo Aura Pineda and Ema Palacios Ordorica. Her parents did not accept the fact that she wanted to become an actress and therefore she decided to leave her house together with her sister María Elena Aura, a writer, and her brother Alejandro Aura, an actor and poet. Her niece María Aura, Alejandro's daughter, is also an actress.

Aura studied acting at the National Academy of Fine Arts. She made her stage debut in 1959, although she became known professionally in 1965. Shortly thereafter she met her first husband, actor Adán Guevara, with whom she had two children. After fifteen years, they divorced. After that, she met the Mexican actor of Spanish origin Rubén Rojo, who subsequently married her and with whom she had a son, actor Rubén Rojo Aura. In total she had three children and four grandchildren.

Aura died in Mexico City on 8 July 2022, at the age of 79.

Filmography

Television 
 Cuentos para solitarios (1999).... Silvia
 Mujer, casos de la vida real (1990 - 1997)
 Televiteatros (1993)
 Hora marcada (episode "De ángeles y demonios") (1990).... Mujer de blanco
 El periquillo sarniento (1981)

Film 

 Coraje (2022)....Alma
 Cuatro Lunas (2017).... Petra
 Las razones del corazón (2011).... Madre  de Emilia
 Las paredes hablan (2010).... Casa Espíritu (voice)
 El baile de San Juan (2010).... Genoveva
 Fragmentos sobre el vértigo (2010).... Madre de Alejandra
 Vaho (2009).... Josefina
 El libro de piedra (2009).... Soledad
 Música de ambulancia (2009)
 Arráncame la vida (2008).... Josefina
 El garabato (2008)
 Mosquita muerta (2008).... Mamá de Sofía
 El milagrito de San Jacinto (2007)
 ...Y sólo humo (2007).... Ana
 Cementerio de papel (2007)
 Si muero lejos de ti (2006)
 El carnaval de Sodoma (2006).... Caricoña
 Una causa noble (2006).... Mamá Lola
 Cicatrices (2005)
 El día menos pensado (2005)
 Peatonal (2004)
 Adán y Eva (Todavía) (2004)
 La luna de Antonio (2003)
 Como Dios manda (2003).... Madre Superiora
 Zurdo (2003)
 Malos presagios (2002)
 Sin sentido (2002)
 Escrito en el cuerpo de la noche (2001).... Gaviota
 Y tu mamá también (2001).... Enriqueta "Queta" Allende
 ¿Y cómo es él? (2001).... Mamá de Sofía
 Así es la vida (2000)
 Azar (2000)
 El evangelio de las maravillas (1998)
 La primera noche (2008).... Mamá del Gordo Tres minutos en la oscuridad (1996)
 En el aire (1995).... Madre de Laura Nadie hablará de nosotras cuando hayamos muerto (1995).... María Luisa Amorosos fantasmas (1994)
 La reina de la noche (1994).... Balmori Nicolás (1994)
 Pueblo viejo (1993)
 Ángel de fuego (1992).... Marta La insaciable (1992)
 Golpe de suerte (1992)
 Rojo amanecer (1991).... Vecina Recuerdo de domingo (1990)
 La secta del sargón (1990)
 La envidia (1988)
 Las inocentes (1986)
 Los Motivos de Luz (1985).... Lic. Marisela Alférez Max Dominio (1981)
 ¡Que viva Tepito! (1981)
 El lugar sin límites (1978).... Emma Los Cachorros (1973)
 Landrú (1973)
 Cayó de la gloria el diablo (1972)
 El águila descalza (1971).... Trabajadora en la factoría Alguien nos quiere matar (1970)
 La excursión (1967)

 Telenovelas 

 Hombre tenías que ser (2013)
 La mujer de Judas (2012) .... Catalina Rojas de Castellanos Entre el amor y el deseo (2010-2011).... Elvira Martínez La loba (2010).... Teresa Secretos del alma (2008-2009).... Regina Cervantes Marina (2006).... Guadalupe "Lupe" Tovar Los Plateados (2005).... Augusta El alma herida (2003-2004).... Doña Guadalupe La duda (2002-2003).... Azucena Golpe bajo (2000-2001).... Lupita Carranza Una luz en el camino (1999).... Chole El privilegio de amar (1998 - 1999).... Josefina "Chepa" Pérez Chiquititas (1998).... Ernestina Pueblo chico, infierno grande (1997).... Mercedes Gente bien (1997).... Márgara La sombra del otro (1996).... Julieta Tavernier Canción de amor (1996)
 Buscando el paraíso (1993)
 Baila conmigo (1992)
 En carne propia (1990 - 1991).... Ángela Cenizas y diamantes (1990).... Amparo del Bosque Teresa (1989).... Balbina Dulce desafío (1988) .... Maritza Miranda Amor en silencio (1988).... Celia Quinceañera (1987).... Gertrudis Te amo (1984).... Mercedes La madre (1980)
 Julia (1979)
 La hora del silencio (1978) .... Matilde Acompáñame (1978).... Angustias Theatre 
 Mujer on the border Algunos cantos del infierno Medea Los signos del zodíaco Rita, Julia La mujer rota El padre El eclipse El pelícano El examen de maridos Antígona Los motivos del lobo La fiaca La morsa Voces en el templo El divino narciso Éramos tres hermanas Conmemorantes''

References

External links
 

1942 births
2022 deaths
20th-century Mexican actresses
21st-century Mexican actresses
Actresses from Mexico City
Mexican film actresses
Mexican stage actresses
Mexican telenovela actresses
Mexican television actresses